William Allen Young (born January 24, 1954) is an American actor and director who has starred in over 100 television, stage, and film projects, including two Academy Award-nominated films, A Soldier's Story and District 9.  He is best known for his roles as Frank Mitchell on UPN's Moesha, Dr. Rollie Guthrie on the CBS medical drama Code Black, and as Judge Joseph Ratner on CBS's CSI Miami. His other television credits include ABC's The Day After, General Hospital, CBS's Madam Secretary, JAG, Atlanta Child Murders, and The Women of Brewster Place, among other shows.  He is also credited with helping to diversify   the ranks of writers, actors, directors and producers in Hollywood through the landmark 2000 TV Network Agreement, which he helped broker while serving as a former co-chair of the African-American Steering Committee of the Directors Guild of America.

Early life and education
Young was born in Washington, D.C. but grew up in South Central, Los Angeles, during the Civil Rights Movement. One of seven children, he was inspired by his mother, Mother Joan Walker of California Southwest Jurisdiction, a high-school dropout who worked as a maid before returning to school at night to get her diploma and a nursing license, which led to a career in the medical profession.

Career
His acting career includes starring roles in the Academy Award-nominated film, A Soldier's Story, and in Women of Brewster Place, The Atlanta Child Murders, Simple Justice, Sins, Lock Up, and In the Belly of the Beast, and the award-winning Lifetime series Any Day Now. He guest starred in the 6th-season episode "Home Court Advantage" of Sister, Sister in 1999. Millions of viewers still recognize him as Frank Mitchell, the tough-but-loving father, on the hit TV show, Moesha, or as Chief Judge Ratner on CSI: Miami. Young has received critical praise for his stage performances in New York City and Los Angeles, and he has performed abroad in Africa, Austria, France, Italy, London, Sri Lanka, and Russia.  Young appears in the movie District 9, filmed on location in South Africa, and released in August 2009. He starred as Harry Wentz on the Disney Channel Original Series Good Luck Charlie (2010-2014). In 2013, Young reunited with Moesha co-star Brandy Norwood on the season six episode, "The Blueprint" on the television show The Game. In 2013, Young made a guest appearance in Madam Secretary episode The Show Must Go On as United States Deputy Secretary of State Steven Cushing.

He is a USC graduate and former #1 College Speaker in the Nation for two consecutive years, when he led the Trojan Debate Squad to a National Championship. He holds a master's degree in Sociolinguistics, a bachelor's degree in Rhetoric & Debate, and has lectured at major colleges and universities nationwide.

As founder/president of the nonprofit Young Center for Academic and Cultural Enrichment, he has helped transform lives and create opportunities for countless underserved youth to obtain a college education.  Students from over 250 schools have participated in the organization's award-winning programs, and its distinguished alumni have been accepted at more than 80 U.S. colleges and universities to date.

He is the recipient of the Ford Foundation Freedom Unsung Award, NAACP Social Achievement Award, Thomas Kilgore, Jr. Humanitarian Service Award, Hero in Education Award, President's Icon Award; and National Organization of Women at Work Man of the Year Award. He was recently inducted into the African-American Hall of Education and deemed an Ambassador of Goodwill by former President Bill Clinton.

Personal life
He has been married to Helen Patrice Moore since November 8, 1986. They have two children.

Filmography

References

External links
 

Living people
African-American male actors
American male television actors
Male actors from Washington, D.C.
1954 births
21st-century African-American people
20th-century African-American people